The brahmavihārā (sublime attitudes, lit. "abodes of brahma") (Pāli: cattāri brahmavihārā), (Sinhala: චත්තාරි බ්‍රහ්මවිහාරා/සතර බ්‍රහ්ම විහරණ) are a series of four Buddhist virtues and the meditation practices made to cultivate them. They are also known as the four immeasurables (Pāli: appamaññā)  or four infinite minds (Chinese: 四無量心). The Brahma-viharas are: 
 loving-kindness or benevolence (mettā)
 compassion (karuṇā)
 empathetic joy (muditā)
 equanimity (upekkhā)

According to the Metta Sutta, cultivation of the four immeasurables has the power to cause the practitioner to be reborn into a "Brahma realm" (Pāli: Brahmaloka).

Etymology and translations
 Pāli: cattāri brahmavihārā
 
  | (Wylie: tshad med bzhi)

Brahmavihāra may be parsed as "Brahma" and "vihāra", which is often rendered into English as "sublime" or "divine abodes".

Apramāṇa, usually translated as "the immeasurables," means "boundlessness, infinitude, a state that is illimitable". When developed to a high degree in meditation, these attitudes are said to make the mind "immeasurable" and like the mind of the loving Brahma (gods).

Other translations: 
 English: four divine abodes, four divine emotions, four sublime attitudes, four divine dwellings.
 East Asia:,,.

The Brahma-vihara
The four Brahma-vihara are: 
 Loving-kindness (Pāli: mettā, Sanskrit: maitrī) is active good will towards all;
 Compassion (Pāli and Sanskrit: karuṇā) results from metta, it is identifying the suffering of others as one's own;
 Sympathetic joy (Pāli and Sanskrit: muditā): is the feeling of joy because others are happy, even if one did not contribute to it, it is a form of sympathetic joy;
 Equanimity (Pāli: upekkhā, Sanskrit: upekṣā): is even-mindedness and serenity, treating everyone impartially.

Early Buddhism
The Brahma-vihara are a pre-Buddhist Brahminical concept, to which the Buddhist tradition gave its own interpretation. The Digha Nikaya asserts the Buddha to be calling the Brahmavihara as "that practice", and he then contrasts it with "my practice" as follows:

According to Richard Gombrich, an indologist and scholar of Sanskrit, Pāli, the Buddhist usage of the brahma-vihāra originally referred to an awakened state of mind, and a concrete attitude towards other beings which was equal to "living with Brahman" here and now. The later tradition took those descriptions too literally, linking them to cosmology and understanding them as "living with Brahman" by rebirth in the Brahma-world. According to Gombrich, "the Buddha taught that kindness - what Christians tend to call love - was a way to salvation.

In the Tevijja Sutta, "The Threefold Knowledge" in the Digha Nikāya or "Collection of the Long Discourses", a group of young Brahmins consulted Lord Buddha about the methods to seek fellowship/companionship/communion with Brahma. He replied that he personally knows the world of Brahma and the way to it, and explains the meditative method for reaching it by using an analogy of the resonance of the conch shell of the aṣṭamaṅgala:

The Buddha then said that the monk must follow this up with an equal suffusion of the entire world with mental projections of compassion, sympathetic joy, and equanimity (regarding all beings with an eye of equality).

In the two Metta Suttas of the Aṅguttara Nikāya, the Buddha states that those who practice radiating the four immeasurables in this life and die "without losing it" are destined for rebirth in a heavenly realm in their next life.  In addition, if such a person is a Buddhist disciple (Pāli: sāvaka) and thus realizes the three characteristics of the five aggregates, then after his heavenly life, this disciple will reach nibbāna.  Even if one is not a disciple, one will still attain the heavenly life, after which, however depending on what his past deeds may have been, one may be reborn in a hell realm, or as an animal or hungry ghost.

In another sutta in the Aṅguttara Nikāya, the laywoman Sāmāvatī is mentioned as an example of someone who excels at loving-kindness. In the Buddhist tradition she is often referred to as such, often citing an account that an arrow shot at her was warded off through her spiritual power.

Visuddhimagga
The four immeasurables are explained in The Path of Purification (Visuddhimagga), written in the fifth century CE by the scholar and commentator Buddhaghoṣa.  They are often practiced by taking each of the immeasurables in turn and applying it to oneself (a practice taught by many contemporary teachers and monastics that was established after the Pali Suttas were completed), and then to others nearby, and so on to everybody in the world, and to everybody in all universes.

A Cavern of Treasures (mDzod-phug)
A Cavern of Treasures is a Bonpo terma uncovered by Shenchen Luga in the early eleventh century. A segment of it enshrines a Bonpo evocation of the four immeasurables. Martin (n.d.: p. 21) identifies the importance of  this scripture for studies of the Zhang-Zhung language.

Origins
Prior to the advent of the Buddha, according to Martin Wiltshire, the pre-Buddhist traditions of Brahma-loka, meditation and these four virtues are evidenced in both early Buddhist and non-Buddhist literature. The Early Buddhist Texts assert that pre-Buddha ancient Indian sages who taught these virtues were earlier incarnations of the Buddha. Post-Buddha, these same virtues are found in the Hindu texts such as verse 1.33 of the Yoga Sutras of Patanjali.

Three of the four immeasurables, namely Maitri, Karuna and Upeksha, are found in the later Upanishads, while all four are found with slight variations – such as pramoda instead of mudita –  in Jainism literature, states Wiltshire. The ancient Indian Paccekabuddhas mentioned in the early Buddhist Suttas – those who attained nibbāna before the Buddha – mention all "four immeasurables."

According to British scholar of Buddhism Peter Harvey, the Buddhist scriptures acknowledge that the four Brahmavihara meditation practices "did not originate within the Buddhist tradition". The Buddha never claimed that the "four immeasurables" were his unique ideas, in a manner similar to "cessation, quieting, nirvana". 

A shift in Vedic ideas, from rituals to virtues, is particularly discernible in the early Upanishadic thought, and it is unclear as to what extent and how early Upanishadic traditions and Sramanic traditions such as Buddhism and Jainism influenced each other on ideas such as "four immeasurables", meditation and Brahmavihara.

In an authoritative Jain scripture, the Tattvartha Sutra (Chapter 7, sutra 11), there is a mention of four right sentiments: Maitri, pramoda, karunya, madhyastha:

References

Sources

See also 
 Karuṇā
 Metta
 Mudita
 Upekkha

Further reading
 Buddhas Reden (Majjhimanikaya), Kristkreitz, Berlin, 1978, tr. by Kurt Schmidt
 Yamamoto, Kosho (tr.) & Page, Tony (revision) (2000). The Mahayana Mahaparinirvana Sutra. London, UK: Nirvana Publications.

External links 
 The Sublime Attitudes: A Study Guide on the Brahmavihāras - Ṭhānissaro Bhikkhu (2014)
 The Four Immeasurable Attitudes in Hinayana, Mahayana, and Bon - by Alexander Berzin (2005)
 An Extensive Commentary on the Four Immeasurables- by  Buddhagupta
 The Four Sublime States by the Venerable Nyanaponika Thera.
 Brahma-Vihara Foundation
 The Four Brahma Viharas
 The Four Immeasurables
 Safe Medicine!

Buddhist philosophical concepts
Buddhist meditation
Pali words and phrases